The Fengdu Yangtze River Bridge  is a suspension bridge which crosses the Yangtze River in Fengdu County, Chongqing, China. Completed in 1996, it has a main span of  placing it among the longest suspension bridges in the world.

See also

List of longest suspension bridge spans
Yangtze River bridges and tunnels

References
The Fengdu Bridge at Bridgemeister.com

Bridges in Chongqing
Bridges over the Yangtze River
Suspension bridges in China
Bridges completed in 1997